Rodney Eastman (born July 20, 1967) is a Canadian actor best known for his role of Joey Crusel in A Nightmare on Elm Street 3: Dream Warriors and A Nightmare on Elm Street 4: The Dream Master.  He is also a musician in a band named King Straggler with fellow actors John Hawkes and Brentley Gore. The band resides in Los Angeles, California.

Life and career
Eastman was born in Montreal in 1967 and moved with his family to Los Angeles when he was five. Deciding while he was attending Schurr High School in Montebello, California that he wanted to be an actor, he studied drama and appeared in numerous high school productions. After graduating, he landed his first job as an extra in the television musical Have You Tried Talking to Patty? Eastman has starred in several films, and his best-known film role is in the 1987 hit horror film A Nightmare on Elm Street 3: Dream Warriors as Joey Crusel. In 1988, he reprised his role in the sequel A Nightmare on Elm Street 4: The Dream Master. His other films include Deadly Weapon, Mobsters, The Opposite of Sex and Knight to F4.

Eastman also made many guest appearances on television shows, including Highway to Heaven, Charles in Charge, Melrose Place, CSI: Crime Scene Investigation, Babylon 5 (as Kiron Maray in season one episode "The War Prayer", 1994), as Sammael in season one episode 18 of Chris Carter's Millennium, The Protector, Renegade, ER and Sliders. He also appeared as Lee Sekelling in The Mentalist.

Filmography

Television

References

External links

1967 births
Living people
Canadian male film actors
Male actors from Montreal
People from Montebello, California